Kengkla Por.Pekko is a Thai Muay Thai fighter.

Titles and accomplishments
Lumpinee Stadium
 Lumpinee Stadium 112 lbs Champion
 2014 Lumpinee Stadium 115 lbs Champion (three defenses)
Channel 7 Stadium
 Channel 7 Boxing Stadium 112 lbs Champion
Professional Boxing Association of Thailand (PAT) 
 2016 Thailand 115 lbs Champion

Fight record

|-  style="background:#fbb;"
| 2018-05-30 || Loss||align=left| Phetchinaraj Sor.Sommai ||  || Thailand || Decision || 5 || 3:00
|-  style="background:#fbb;"
| 2018-03-31 || Loss||align=left| Yodkrisada Yutchonburi || Omnoi Stadium || Thailand || KO || 4 ||
|-  style="background:#cfc;"
| 2018-02-26 || Win||align=left| Jompikart Chuwattana || Phoenix 5 Bangkok || Thailand || Decision || 5 || 3:00
|-  style="background:#cfc;"
| 2018-01-08 || Win||align=left| Reualuang Naveeandaman || Rajadamnern Stadium || Bangkok, Thailand || Decision || 5 || 3:00
|-  style="background:#fbb;"
| 2017-12-16 || Loss ||align=left| Rithidet Sitchefboontham  || Omnoi Boxing Stadium || Thailand || Decision || 5 || 3:00
|-  style="background:#fbb;"
| 2017-11-01 || Loss ||align=left| Rungkit Wor.Sanprapai  || Rajadamnern Stadium || Bangkok, Thailand || Decision || 5 || 3:00
|-  style="background:#fbb;"
| 2017-08-21|| Loss||align=left| Saksit Tor.Paopiamsapraedriew || Rajadamnern Stadium ||Bangkok, Thailand || Decision  || 5 || 3:00
|-  style="background:#cfc;"
| 2017-07-23|| Win||align=left| Panomroonglek Kratingdaenggym ||  Rangsit Boxing Stadium  ||  Pathum Thani, Thailand || Decision|| 5 || 3:00
|-  style="background:#fbb;"
| 2017-05-26|| Loss||align=left| Prakayphet Nitisamuy || Lumpinee Stadium ||Bangkok, Thailand || Decision  || 5 || 3:00
|-  style="background:#fbb;"
| 2017-04-07|| Loss||align=left| Manasak Pisinchai || Lumpinee Stadium ||Bangkok, Thailand || Decision  || 5 || 3:00
|-  style="background:#fbb;"
| 2017-03-08|| Loss||align=left| Manasak Pisinchai || Rajadamnern Stadium ||Bangkok, Thailand || Decision  || 5 || 3:00
|-  style="background:#fbb;"
| 2016-12-17|| Loss||align=left| Sprinter Pangkongprab || Lumpinee Stadium ||Bangkok, Thailand || Decision  || 5 || 3:00
|-  style="background:#fbb;"
| 2016-09-17|| Loss||align=left| Prakayphet Nitisamuy || Lumpinee Stadium ||Bangkok, Thailand || KO || 4 ||
|-  style="background:#fbb;"
| 2016-08-05|| Loss||align=left| Wanchalong PK.Saenchai ||  ||Hat Yai, Thailand || Decision  || 5 || 3:00
|-  style="background:#fbb;"
| 2016-07-29|| Loss||align=left| Jomhod Eminentair || Lumpinee Stadium ||Bangkok, Thailand || KO|| 2 ||
|-  style="background:#cfc;"
| 2016-06-27|| Win||align=left| Jakdao Tepkaseam || Lumpinee Stadium ||Bangkok, Thailand || Decision  || 5 || 3:00
|-  style="background:#fbb;"
| 2016-06-03|| Loss||align=left| Wanchalong PK.Saenchai || Lumpinee Stadium ||Bangkok, Thailand || Decision  || 5 || 3:00
|-
! style=background:white colspan=9 |
|-  style="background:#cfc;"
| 2016-05-02|| Win||align=left| Pichitchai PK.Saenchai || Rajadamnern Stadium || Bangkok, Thailand || Decision || 5 || 3:00
|-  style="background:#fbb;"
| 2016-04-06|| Loss||align=left| Kumandoi Petcharoenvit || Rajadamnern Stadium || Bangkok, Thailand || Decision || 5 || 3:00
|-  style="background:#cfc;"
| 2016-03-16|| Win||align=left| Wanchalong PK.Saenchai ||  || Phra Nakhon Si Ayutthaya, Thailand || Decision  || 5 || 3:00
|-
! style=background:white colspan=9 |
|-  style="background:#fbb;"
| 2016-02-14|| Loss ||align=left| Fasitong Sor.Jor.Piek-Uthai || Channel 7 Boxing Stadium || Bangkok, Thailand || Decision  || 5 || 3:00
|-  style="background:#cfc;"
| 2015-12-20|| Win ||align=left|  Jomhod Eminentair || Channel 7 Boxing Stadium || Bangkok, Thailand || Decision  || 5 || 3:00
|-  style="background:#cfc;"
| 2015-09-04|| Win||align=left| Puenkol Diamond98 || Lumpinee Stadium || Bangkok, Thailand || Decision || 5 || 3:00
|-
! style=background:white colspan=9 |
|-  style="background:#cfc;"
| 2015-08-06|| Win||align=left| Pichitchai PK.Saenchai || Rajadamnern Stadium || Bangkok, Thailand || Decision || 5 || 3:00
|-  style="background:#fbb;"
| 2015-07-02|| Loss ||align=left| Prajanchai P.K.Saenchaimuaythaigym || Rajadamnern Stadium || Bangkok, Thailand || Decision || 5 || 3:00
|-  style="background:#cfc;"
| 2015-06-05|| Win||align=left| Jomhod Eminentair|| Lumpinee Stadium || Bangkok, Thailand || Decision  || 5 || 3:00
|-
! style=background:white colspan=9 |
|-  style="background:#cfc;"
| 2015-04-29|| Win||align=left| Wanchalong PK.Saenchai|| Rajadamnern Stadium || Bangkok, Thailand || KO || 3 ||
|-  style="background:#cfc;"
| 2015-04-05|| Win||align=left| Arashi Fujihara|| Shuken 25 || Tokyo, Japan || Decision  || 5 || 3:00
|-
! style=background:white colspan=9 |
|-  style="background:#cfc;"
| 2015-03-09|| Win||align=left| Rungubon Eminent Air || Rajadamnern Stadium || Bangkok, Thailand || Decision  || 5 || 3:00
|-  style="background:#fbb;"
| 2015-01-15|| Loss||align=left| Sprinter Pangkongprab || Rajadamnern Stadium || Bangkok, Thailand || Decision  || 5 || 3:00
|-  style="background:#cfc;"
| 2014-12-09|| Win||align=left| Wanchalong PK.Saenchai || Lumpinee Stadium || Bangkok, Thailand || Decision  || 5 || 3:00
|-
! style=background:white colspan=9 |
|-  style="background:#cfc;"
| 2014-10-31|| Win||align=left|  Dapplaypun Petch.Por.Tor.Aor || || Bangkok, Thailand || Decision  || 5 || 3:00
|-  style="background:#fbb;"
| 2014-09-30|| Loss||align=left| Wanchalong PK.Saenchai || Lumpinee Stadium || Thailand || Decision  || 5 || 3:00
|-  style="background:#cfc;"
| 2014-09-09|| Win||align=left|  Dapplaypun Petch.Por.Tor.Aor || Lumpinee Stadium || Bangkok, Thailand || Decision  || 5 || 3:00
|-  style="background:#cfc;"
| 2014-08-08|| Win||align=left|  Jomhod Eminentair || Lumpinee Stadium || Bangkok, Thailand || Decision  || 5 || 3:00
|-  style="background:#cfc;"
| 2014-07-17|| Win ||align=left| Wanchalong PK.Saenchai ||  || Thailand || Decision  || 5 || 3:00
|-  style="background:#cfc;"
| 2014-06-06|| Win||align=left| Gusagonnoi Sor.Joonsen || Lumpinee Stadium ||Bangkok, Thailand || Decision  || 5 || 3:00
|-  style="background:#cfc;"
| 2014-03-18|| Win||align=left| Phet Aor.Phimonsri || Lumpinee Stadium ||Bangkok, Thailand || Decision  || 5 || 3:00
|-  style="background:#cfc;"
| 2014-02-25|| Win||align=left| Visanlek Seatrandiscovery || Lumpinee Stadium ||Bangkok, Thailand || Decision  || 5 || 3:00
|-  style="background:#fbb;"
| 2014-01-28|| Loss||align=left| Prakayphet Nitisamuy || Lumpinee Stadium ||Bangkok, Thailand || Decision  || 5 || 3:00
|-  style="background:#c5d2ea;"
| 2013-12-27|| Draw||align=left| Phet Aor.Phimonsri  || Lumpinee Stadium ||Bangkok, Thailand || Decision  || 5 || 3:00
|-  style="background:#fbb;"
| 2013-11-15|| Loss||align=left| Nuengthep Sagami  || Lumpinee Stadium ||Bangkok, Thailand || Decision  || 5 || 3:00
|-  style="background:#cfc;"
| 2013-07-16|| Win ||align=left| Phet Aor.Phimonsri || Lumpinee Stadium ||Bangkok, Thailand || Decision  || 5 || 3:00
|-  style="background:#fbb;"
| 2013-06-09|| Loss||align=left| Wanchalong PK.Saenchai || Channel 7 Boxing Stadium || Bangkok, Thailand || Decision  || 5 || 3:00
|-
! style=background:white colspan=9 |
|-  style="background:#cfc;"
| 2013-05-07|| Win||align=left| Wanchalong PK.Saenchai || Lumpinee Stadium || Bangkok, Thailand || Decision  || 5 || 3:00
|-  style="background:#fbb;"
| 2013-04-09|| Loss||align=left| Wanchana Or Boonchay || Lumpinee Stadium ||Bangkok, Thailand || Decision  || 5 || 3:00
|-  style="background:#fbb;"
| 2012-11-27 || Loss||align=left| Pongrit Chor Churngamon  || Lumpinee Stadium || Bangkok, Thailand || Decision || 5 || 3:00
|-  style="background:#cfc;"
| 2012-11-06 || Win||align=left| Muangthai PKSaenchaimuaythaigym  || Lumpinee Stadium || Bangkok, Thailand || Decision || 5 || 3:00
|-  style="background:#cfc;"
| 2012-08-14 || Win||align=left| Cheabkom Sitjaagun  || Lumpinee Stadium || Bangkok, Thailand || Decision || 5 || 3:00
|-  style="background:#fbb;"
| 2012-05-15 || Loss||align=left| Muangthai PKSaenchaimuaythaigym  || Lumpinee Stadium || Bangkok, Thailand || TKO || 3 ||
|-  style="background:#cfc;"
| 2012-03-27 || Win||align=left| Songkom Sakhomsin  || Lumpinee Stadium || Bangkok, Thailand || TKO (High Kick)|| 3 ||
|-  style="background:#cfc;"
| 2012-03-06 || Win||align=left| Kan Kor.Kampanat  || Lumpinee Stadium || Bangkok, Thailand || Decision || 5 || 3:00
|-  style="background:#fbb;"
| 2012-01-13 || Loss||align=left| Kan Kor.Kampanat  || Lumpinee Stadium || Bangkok, Thailand || Decision || 5 || 3:00

|-  style="background:#c5d2ea;"
| 2011-11-11 || Draw||align=left| Prakaipet EminentAir  ||Lumpinee Stadium || Bangkok, Thailand || Decision  || 5 || 3:00

|-  style="background:#fbb;"
| 2011-06-19 || Loss||align=left| Kusakornnoi Sitphetubon  || Channel 7 Boxing Stadium || Bangkok, Thailand || Decision  || 5 || 3:00
|-  style="background:#fbb;"
| 2011-01-09 || Loss||align=left| Pentai Singpatong  || Channel 7 Boxing Stadium || Bangkok, Thailand || Decision  || 5 || 3:00
|-
! style=background:white colspan=9 |
|-  style="background:#cfc;"
| 2010-08-27|| Win||align=left| Chucharoen Wiriyafarm ||Lumpinee Stadium|| Bangkok, Thailand || Decision || 5 || 3:00
|-  style="background:#cfc;"
| 2009-09-22|| Win||align=left| Monkhao Sitjaphan ||Lumpinee Stadium|| Bangkok, Thailand || Decision || 5 || 3:00
|-
| colspan=9 | Legend:

References

Kengkla Por.Pekko
Living people
1993 births
Kengkla Por.Pekko